Mid Rivers Mall (formerly Westfield Shoppingtown Mid Rivers) is a shopping center in St. Peters, Missouri, just off Interstate 70. The mall opened in 1987 and has since grown to be St. Charles County's largest shopping center. Mid Rivers Mall includes over 140 shops. The anchor stores are Macy's, Dillard's, H&M, JCPenney, Marcus Theatres, Vintage Stock, and Dick's Sporting Goods. There is one vacant anchor store that was once Sears. The mall is owned by CBL Properties, which acquired the property in 2007 from the Westfield Group.

History
Famous-Barr opened their store in 1981 on the site of the future Mid Rivers Mall. The mall was finished in 1987 with two anchor stores, Dillard's and Famous-Barr, as well as a food court; a 6-screen cinema opened in 1988. The 1990 expansion of Mid Rivers Mall included a new anchor store, Sears. Another expansion of Mid Rivers Mall in 1996 added the fourth anchor, JCPenney, which moved from nearby Mark Twain Mall in St. Charles. In 1999, Wehrenberg demolished the mall's 6-screen theater and built a new 14-screen megaplex. Later that year, Chili's opened outside the mall. Best Buy then opened in April 2000. Upon the acquisition of The May Department Stores Company by Federated Department Stores, Famous-Barr was rebranded Macy's in 2006. Dick's Sporting Goods opened at the mall between JCPenney and Sears in 2008. 

In February 2018, the mall began offering relatively inexpensive weekly lease rates so new retail businesses can test use of physical retail space.  The initiative drives foot traffic to the mall while potentially bringing in long-term tenants. This same year the mall underwent renovation, with H&M opening, giving the mall another anchor store.

On August 6, 2019, it was announced that Sears would be closing this location as part of a plan to close 26 stores nationwide. The store closed on October 27, 2019, leaving Macy's, Dillard's, Marcus Theaters, V-Stock, H&M, JCPenney, and Dick's Sporting Goods as the remaining anchor stores.

Crime and legal issues
In September 2017, the mall owner sued former tenant Max & Erma's, alleging that the franchisee owed over $680,000 in rent, interest, and fees after vacating their nearly  mall space in August; its 2011 lease was to expire in January 2022.

In December 2017, a 59-year-old man was attacked and his vehicle carjacked during late Saturday morning hours near the mall's Dillard's store.

In March 2018, Mid Rivers was reported as one of several St. Louis area malls at which a woman allegedly photographed young girls in bathroom stalls to share with a man. In July 2018, it was reported that a 33-year-old man had been charged with invasion of privacy after he was caught attempting to record a woman while she was in a dressing room at the mall's Windsor's Fashions store.

In July 2018, a shoplifting theft from a Mid Rivers Mall department store resulted in a high speed chase to St. Louis. In January 2020, two shoplifters drove over a police officer's foot while fleeing.

References

External links
 Mid Rivers Mall Website
 CBL Properties

CBL Properties
Shopping malls established in 1987
Buildings and structures in St. Charles County, Missouri
Shopping malls in Missouri
St. Peters, Missouri
1987 establishments in Missouri